Northeast Branch Anacostia River is a  free-flowing stream in Prince George's County, Maryland. It is a tributary of the Anacostia River, which flows to the Potomac River and the Chesapeake Bay.

Course

The headwaters of the Northeast Branch are at the confluence of Indian Creek and Paint Branch, located on the eastern edge of the community of College Park.

Watershed
The Northeast Branch watershed in Prince George's County includes portions of the communities of Beltsville, Greenbelt, College Park, New Carrollton, Riverdale Park, Hyattsville, Berwyn Heights and Edmonston. Portions of the Paint Branch and Little Paint Branch tributaries also drain the Cloverly, Colesville, Fairland, White Oak and Hillandale communities in Montgomery County. Major institutions in the watershed include the Beltsville Agricultural Research Center, University of Maryland, College Park and Greenbelt Park.

Geology
Northeast Branch is located in the Atlantic coastal plain geologic region.

Tributaries
 Brier Ditch
 Indian Creek
 Little Paint Branch
 Paint Branch
 Still Creek
 Upper Beaverdam Creek

Crossings

See also
List of Maryland rivers
Anacostia Tributary Trails

References

 Maryland Department of Natural Resources, Annapolis, MD (2005). "Characterization of the Anacostia River Watershed in Prince George’s County, Maryland."
 Montgomery County Department of Environmental Protection (MCDEP), Rockville, MD (1997). "Little Paint Branch Watershed Study."
 MCDEP (1998). "Countywide Stream Protection Strategy: Paint Branch Watershed."

External links
 Anacostia Watershed Society - Detailed maps and photos of stream conditions
 Anacostia Watershed Restoration Partnership
 Anacostia Tributary Trail System - Prince George's County Dept. of Parks & Recreation

Anacostia River
Rivers of Montgomery County, Maryland
Rivers of Prince George's County, Maryland
Rivers of Maryland